Ernest Malden (10 October 1870 – 13 September 1955) was an English cricketer. He was a right-handed batsman and a right-arm medium-pace bowler who played one first-class cricket match for Kent County Cricket Club in 1893.

Malden was born in Sheldwich in Kent in 1870. His only first-class appearance was against MCC in June 1893 at Lord's. His cousin Eustace Malden, played 12 times for Kent between 1892 and 1893 and Eustace's son, Jack Malden, also played 24 first-class matches, mainly for Sussex in the early 1920s.

Malden died at Salisbury in Rhodesia in 1955 aged 84.

Notes

References

External links

1870 births
1955 deaths
English cricketers
Kent cricketers